Sidney Schwartz was a tennis player from the United States who competed in the mid-20th century. He reached the quarterfinals of the U.S. National Championships in 1950, losing to Dick Savitt.

Career
Schwartz played his first tournament at the Eastern Indoors held in New York in 1945 and played at the Bassford Wood Courts. He won two Eastern Clay Court Championships in 1951 and 1962. He reached the final of the US National Indoor Championships in 1948, losing to Bill Talbert. In 1957 he won the East of Ireland Championships in Dublin against Isaías Pimentel. 

He competed in the 1961 Maccabiah Games in Israel, losing in the third round to Israeli Elazar Davidman. Schwartz played his final tournament at the Long Island Championships at Great Neck, New York in 1968.

References

External links
 

American male tennis players
Living people
Year of birth missing (living people)
Maccabiah Games competitors for the United States
Maccabiah Games tennis players
Competitors at the 1961 Maccabiah Games